The 2010 World Rowing Championships were World Rowing Championships that were held from 31 October to 7 November 2010 on Lake Karapiro near Cambridge, New Zealand. The annual week-long rowing regatta was organised by FISA (the International Rowing Federation). Usually held at the end of the northern hemisphere summer, they were held later in the year in the southern hemisphere. In non-Olympic years the regatta is the highlight of the international rowing calendar.

Background
The World Rowing Championships were previously held at Lake Karapiro in 1978. Rowing's international body said Lake Karapiro's 2010 World Rowing Championships raised the bar for the rest of the world and more international events would be held there.

The 2010 World Rowing Championships turned out to be one of the most impressive championships ever. Of the 161 races at the championships, Robert Treharne Jones, FISA commentator (GBR). commentated 88 of them, “by far my favourite race was the men’s pair. It was an awesome race and it was all that it was billed to be and more. Although it was a six boat final it was really one on one between New Zealand and Great Britain and to have them so close all the way. The crowd were literally on their feet. The event was great from every point of view. I can’t fault it. The organisers worked very hard to get everything right.”

It was predicted that it would take at least 70,000 people to make back the £16m price tag [but 66,000 attended]. The event lost $2.2m and a report  by SPARC (Sport And Recreation New Zealand, rebranded as Sport New Zealand in 2012)   found that a lack of clarity around roles and responsibilities of the Karapiro 2010 Board was a factor, alongside others mostly relating to shortcomings in governance, inadequate financial management, and less revenue than expected from ticket sales.

SPARC chief executive Peter Miskimmin said the review was a stark reminder for everyone involved in hosting major events in New Zealand, including the Government agencies which invest in them. “The Karapiro 2010 Board was committed to putting on a world-class event, and they achieved that. Operationally the event was a huge success." Miskimmin said, adding that the findings of the SPARC review would be used to develop additional good practice guidelines for those running future major events.

With the roaring success of the world championships behind them, Rowing New Zealand is eager to make further use of their world-class facility at Lake Karapiro.

To interpret abbreviations in medals tables see Glossary of rowing terms. FISA publishes results online.

Medal summary

Men's events
 Non-Olympic classes

Women's events

 Non-Olympic classes

Adaptive events
 Non-Paralympic classes

Medal table

Men's and women's events

Adaptive events

References

External links

Official website
Linked website
Rowing In New Zealand & Rowing Championships 2010 on Te Ara Encyclopaedia of New Zealand
News article at New Zealand Herald website
News article at Stuff (Fairfax Media) website
 World Rowing Championships 2010: Team GB pick up sculling golds

World Rowing Championships
World Rowing Championships 2010
World Rowing Championships
World Rowing Championships
World Rowing Championships 2010
World Rowing Championships 2010
Rowing
Rowing